This is a list of Mexican railroads, common carrier railroads operating as part of rail transport in Mexico.

Passenger rail
Passenger regional rail within urban areas includes:
 Ferrocarril Suburbano de la Zona Metropolitana de México
 STC Metrorrey
 Veracruz Trams
 Servicio de Transportes Eléctricos del D.F.
 Metro de la Ciudad de México
 Sistema de Tren Eléctrico Urbano
 Toluca–Mexico City commuter rail (under construction)

There is also the
 Ferrocarril Chihuahua al Pacífico, which connects Los Mochis, Sinaloa to Chihuahua, Chihuahua
 Tequila Express, which connects Guadalajara, Jalisco to Tequila, Jalisco

Class I railroads

There are three Class I railroads:
Ferromex (FXE)
Kansas City Southern de México (KCSM)
Ferrosur (FSRR)
Additionally the three Class I railroads jointly own a railroad that provides access to Mexico City
Ferrocarril y Terminal del Valle de México (Ferrovalle)

Shortline railroads

Shortline and terminal railroad companies include:
Linea Ferrocarril Coahuila-Durango (LFCD)
Baja California Railroad (BJRR)
CG Railway
Ferrocarril Transistmico
Ferrocarril Chiapas-Mayab (FCCM)

Railway links with adjacent countries
CG Railway operates a train ferry between the port of Mobile at Mobile, Alabama and the port of Coatzacoalcos, Veracruz.

To its south, Mexico shares an  border with Guatemala and a  border with Belize. There is rebuilt link with rail transport in Guatemala at Ciudad Tecún Umán in Ayutla, San Marcos, with a break of gauge.  /  (rebuilt as standard gauge in 2019)

Former railroads
The following is a list of former railroads:

Bosques de Chihuahua
Carrizo Gorge de Mexico
Ferrocarril Aguascalientes
Ferrocarril Atlamaxac
Ferrocarril Cazadero la Torre y Tepetongo
Ferrocarril Cazadero y San Pablo
Ferrocarril Cazadero y Solis
Ferrocarril Central Mexicano (see also Ferrocarriles Nacionales de Mexico)
Ferrocarril Chihuahua al Pacifico now operated as a passenger line by Ferromex
Ferrocarril Coahuila y Zacatecas
Ferrocarril de Córdoba a Huatusco
Ferrocarril Desague del Valle de Mexico
El Oro Mining and Railway Company
El Paso Southern Railway (see Mexico North Western Railway)
Ferrocarril Guanajuato a San Luis de la Paz y Pozos
Ferrocarril Hidalgo y Nordeste
Ferrocarril de Hornos
Ferrocarril Inter-California
Ferrocarril Interoceanico
Ferrocarril Ixtlahuaca
Ferrocarril Jalapa y Cordoba
Kansas City, Mexico and Orient Railway
Ferrocarril Mapimi
Ferrocarril Matehuala
Ferrocarril Merida a Calkini
Ferrocarril de Merida a Peto
Ferrocarril Merida a Valladolid
Ferrocarril Mexicali y Golfo
Ferrocarril Mexicano (FCM)
Ferrocarril Mexicano del Sur
Mexico North Western Railway
Ferrocarril Michoacan y Pacifico
Ferrocarril Monte Alto y Tlalnepantla
Monterrey Mineral and Terminal Railway
Ferrocarril Nacozari
Ferrocarril Nacional de la Baja California
Ferrocarril Oaxaca a Ejutla
Ferrocarril del Pacifico (FCP)
Panuco Mountain and Monclova Railroad
Ferrocarril Parral y Durango
Ferrocarril Peninsular de Merida-Yucatan
Potosi Central Railroad
Ferrocarril Potosi y Rio Verde (FPyRv)
Rio Grande, Sierra Madre & Pacific Railway (see Mexico North Western Railway)
Ferrocarril San Gregorio
Ferrocarril San Marcos a Huajapan de Leon
Ferrocarril San Rafael y Atlixco
Sinaloa and Durango Railroad
Ferrocarril Sonora-Baja California (SBC)
Ferrocarriles Nacionales de Mexico (Freight Service)
Southern Pacific of Mexico
Ferrocarril de Tacubaya
Ferrocarril Tlacotepec a Huajapan de Leon
Ferrocarril Toluca y Zitacuaro
Ferrocarril Toluca a Tenango y San Juan
Ferrocarril Torres a Prietas
Tehuantepec National Railway (see Ferrocarril Transismitico)
Ferrocarriles Unidos del Sureste (FUS)
Ferrocarriles Unidos de Yucatán (U de Y)
Ferrocarril del Valle de Mexico
Ferrocarril Vanegas, Cedral, y Rio Verde
Ferrocarril Vera Cruz a Anton Lizardo y Alvarado

See also

 Aerotrén
 Copper Canyon
 Decauville
 Guadalajara light rail system
 La Bestia
 List of named passenger trains of Mexico
 Mexico City Metro
 Monterrey Metro
 Tequila Express
 Xochimilco Light Rail
 Mayan Train

References

Notes

External links

Ferrocarril del Sureste FERROSUR
Ferrocarril Mexicano FERROMEX
Kansas City Southern de Mexico KCSM (Formerly TFM)
Ferrocarril Coahuila-Durango LFCD
Ferrocarriles Chiapas-Mayab FCCM
MEXLIST—The Group for Mexican Railway Information
FERROMEXICO Information, pictures, maps and plenty of Mexican railroad data
RIHEL Articles and pictures about Mexican railroads, in Spanish only.
El Chepe: Ferrocarril Chihuahua al Pacífico

 
 
Railroads